Agnewville is an extinct unincorporated community in Prince William County, Virginia, United States. Agnewville lies to the west of the town of Occoquan at the intersection of Minnieville (formerly Davis Ford) and Telegraph Roads. It has also been known as Agnesville  and Chinn Town.

Agnewville ran along Minnieville Road from Old Bridge Road to the old Horner Road (near the current Caton Hill Road).  Agnewville flourished from 1890 to 1927.

History
The land that became Agnewville was purchased and settled by freed slaves. The Chinn Family, freed by Henny Fielder Roe after the American Civil War, was given enough money to purchase about 500 acres of land in 1889.

The U.S. Post Office in Agnewville was established in 1891, and was closed in March 1927, with the mail services transferred to the Woodbridge Post Office.

The Mount Olive Baptist Church was founded in 1915 on Telegraph Road, with land donated by William Wallace Chinn.

Agnewville was located along the main stage road out of Occoquan, Virginia. The decline of Agnewville came with the relocation of the main highway from Telegraph Road to the present day U.S. Route 1 through Woodbridge, Virginia.

Economy
Farming and logging were the main economic activities.

Present day
Most of Agnewville has been redeveloped.  North of Minnieville Road is now the community of Lake Ridge, Virginia.  South of Minnieville Road has been developed to some extent, and much of the undeveloped area is zoned for commercial and residential development.  The Mount Olive Baptist Church on Telegraph Road still serves the area.

Notes

References
The Prince William County Historical Commission (Va.) (2006).
Prince William County Historical Commission disappearing towns project / Prince William County Historical Commission.

External links

Unincorporated communities in Prince William County, Virginia
Washington metropolitan area
Unincorporated communities in Virginia